Three at Wolfe's Door is a collection of Nero Wolfe mystery novellas by Rex Stout, published by the Viking Press in 1960. The book comprises three stories, one of them published previously:
 
 "Poison à la Carte"
 "Method Three for Murder" (previously serialized in three issues of The Saturday Evening Post, January 30–February 13, 1960)
 "The Rodeo Murder"

Publication history
1960, New York: The Viking Press, April 29, 1960, hardcover
In his limited-edition pamphlet, Collecting Mystery Fiction #10, Rex Stout's Nero Wolfe Part II, Otto Penzler describes the first edition of Three at Wolfe's Door: "Orange cloth, front cover and spine printed with dark brown. Issued in a mainly green-brown dust wrapper."
In April 2006, Firsts: The Book Collector's Magazine estimated that the first edition of Three at Wolfe's Door had a value of between $200 and $350. The estimate is for a copy in very good to fine condition in a like dustjacket.
1960, New York: Viking (Mystery Guild), July 1960, hardcover
The far less valuable Viking book club edition may be distinguished from the first edition in three ways:
 The dust jacket has "Book Club Edition" printed on the inside front flap, and the price is absent (first editions may be price clipped if they were given as gifts).
 Book club editions are sometimes thinner and always taller (usually a quarter of an inch) than first editions.
 Book club editions are bound in cardboard, and first editions are bound in cloth (or have at least a cloth spine).
1961, London: Collins Crime Club, January 20, 1961, hardcover
1961, New York: Bantam #A-2276, August 1961
1995, New York: Bantam Crime Line  September 1995, paperback, Rex Stout Library edition with introduction by Margaret Maron
1997, Newport Beach, California: Books on Tape, Inc.  October 31, 1997, audio cassette (unabridged, read by Michael Prichard)
2010, New York: Bantam Crimeline  June 9, 2010, e-book

References

1960 short story collections
Nero Wolfe short story collections
Viking Press books